Ismet Šišić (born 4 June 1958) is a Bosnian retired footballer.

Club career
Šišić spent his entire career with Velež Mostar, winning the 1985–86 Yugoslav Cup with them.

References

External links

parapsihopatologija.com
forum.b92.net

1958 births
Living people
People from Čapljina
Association football defenders
Bosnia and Herzegovina footballers
Yugoslav footballers
FK Velež Mostar players
Yugoslav First League players